Oman Arab Bank is a commercial bank in Oman, established in 1984. It is jointly owned by Arab Bank plc (49%), Oman International Development and Investment Company SAOG (31.63%) and other individual or corporate shareholders (19.37%).

History 
Oman Arab Bank was established in 1984.

In 2014, the bank launched its digital transformation strategy, enhancing its banking channels and services by employing the state-of-the-art technologies, promoting a culture of innovation and talent management, as well as providing added-value services through strategic partnerships. The CEO Abdul Qader Ahmed Askalan resigned in 2013.

Oman Arab Bank has acquired 100% of Alizz Islamic Bank in June 2020 and merged its Al Yusr Islamic Banking window with Alizz Islamic Bank.

On July 6, 2020, Oman Arab Bank was transformed from a closed to a public joint stock company, with its shares listed on the Muscat Securities Market (MSM).

Activities 
Oman Arab Bank operates in the retail banking, corporate banking, project finance, investment banking, trade finance and Islamic banking sector.

See also

List of banks in Oman

References

External links
  
  

Banks of Oman
Banks established in 1984
1984 establishments in Oman
Companies based in Muscat, Oman